= Warnery type foundry =

Warnery
- Industry: Type foundry

Warnery was a type foundry.

== Typefaces ==
These foundry types were produced by the Warnery type foundry:

- Mozart Noir
  - Daiphane, an in-line version of Mozart Noir.
